Harsin County is in Kermanshah province, Iran. At the 2006 census, the county's population was 90,452 in 20,788 households. The following census in 2011 counted 86,342 people in 23,176 households. At the 2016 census, the county's population was 78,350 in 22,506 households.

The county is bounded to the north by Sahneh County, to the south by Khorramabad County in Lorestan Province, to the east by Nahavand County in Hamadan Province and to the west by Kermanshah County.  The population is Kurdish and Shi'ite.

Attractions of the county include the Essaqwand Rock Tombs and the Behistun Inscription.

Administrative divisions

The population history of Harsin County's administrative divisions over three consecutive censuses is shown in the following table. The latest census shows two districts, four rural districts, and two cities.

References

 

Counties of Kermanshah Province